Suran-e Sofla (also Romanized as Sūrān-e Soflá; also known as Shīd‘alī, Sūrān, and Sūrān-e Pā’īn) is a village in Howmeh-ye Shomali Rural District, in the Central District of Eslamabad-e Gharb County, Kermanshah Province, Iran. At the 2006 census, its population was 133, in 29 families.

References 

Populated places in Eslamabad-e Gharb County